This is the filmography of the late Indian actress and former Tamil Nadu chief minister J. Jayalalithaa who acted in over 140 films including Tamil, Telugu, Kannada, Hindi, Malayalam and English.

Filmography

1960s

1970s

1980s, 1990s & 2000s

Discography

Notes

References

External links
 

Filmography
Indian filmographies
Actress filmographies